The Luxembourg National Road Race Championship is a cycling race where Luxembourg cyclists decide who will become the champion for the year to come. The event was established in 1922, and a separate Luxembourgish National Time Trial Championships has been held since 1999.

The women's championship was not established until 1959. The most wins were scored by Elsy Jacobs, who won 15 road championships.

The winners of each event are awarded a symbolic cycling jersey which is red, white and blue, just like the flag of Luxembourg, these colours can be worn by the rider at other road racing events in the country to show their status as national champion. The champion's stripes can be combined into a sponsored rider's team kit design for this purpose.

Men

Women

Notes

References

National road cycling championships
Cycle races in Luxembourg
Recurring sporting events established in 1922
1922 establishments in Luxembourg